Kosmos 7 ( meaning Cosmos 7), also known as Zenit-2 No.4 and occasionally in the West as Sputnik 17 was a Soviet reconnaissance satellite launched in 1962. It was the seventh satellite to be designated under the Kosmos system, and the second successful launch of a Soviet reconnaissance satellite.

Spacecraft
Kosmos 7 was a Zenit-2 satellite, a first generation, low resolution reconnaissance satellite derived from the Vostok spacecraft used for crewed flights. It also marked the first successful launch of a Vostok-2, on the second attempt. The first Vostok-2 launch, also carrying a Zenit-2 satellite, suffered an engine failure seconds after launch on 1 June 1962, fell back to earth and exploded within  of the launch pad.

Kosmos 7 was one of a series of Soviet Earth satellites whose purpose was to study outer space, the upper layers of the atmosphere, and the Earth. Scientific data and measurements were relayed to Earth by multichannel telemetry systems equipped with space-borne memory units.

Mission
Vostok-2, s/n T15000-07, was used to launch Kosmos 7. The launch was conducted from Site 1/5 at the Baikonur Cosmodrome, and occurred at 09:18:31 GMT on 28 July 1962. It conducted a four-day mission, before being deorbited and landing by parachute on 1 August 1962, and recovered by the Soviet forces in the steppe in Kazakhstan.

It was the second Zenit-2 to reach orbit, the first being Kosmos 4. The next Zenit-2 launch will be Kosmos 9. In addition to reconnaissance, it was also used for radiation measurements made for safety during the flight of the Vostok 3 and Vostok 4 spacecraft.

See also

 1962 in spaceflight

References

Spacecraft launched in 1962
1962 in the Soviet Union
Kosmos satellites
Spacecraft which reentered in 1962